Metaclisa is a genus of darkling beetles in the family Tenebrionidae, the sole genus of the tribe Metaclisini. There are at least four described species in Metaclisa, found in North America, the Neotropics, the Palearctic, and Indomalaya.

Species
These species belong to the genus Metaclisa:
 Metaclisa atra LeConte, 1866
 Metaclisa azurea (Waltl, 1838)
 Metaclisa marginalis Horn, 1870
 Metaclisa seditiosa (LeConte 1866)

References

Tenebrionoidea